Elina Sergeyevna Mitrofanova (born 28 January 1992) is a Russian ice hockey player, currently playing with HC Agidel Ufa of the Zhenskaya Hockey League (ZhHL).

She represented  at the IIHF Women's World Championships in 2016 and 2017, and medaled at three Winter Universiades, winning silver in 2013 and gold in 2015 and 2017. As a junior player, she was a member of the Russian national under-18 ice hockey team and participated in the IIHF Women's U18 World Championships in 2008, 2009, and 2010.

References

External links
 

1992 births
Living people
People from Sysertsky District
Sportspeople from Sverdlovsk Oblast
Russian women's ice hockey forwards
HC Agidel Ufa players
Universiade medalists in ice hockey
Universiade gold medalists for Russia
Universiade silver medalists for Russia
Competitors at the 2013 Winter Universiade
Competitors at the 2015 Winter Universiade
Competitors at the 2017 Winter Universiade